Eupithecia lugubris is a moth in the  family Geometridae. It is found in Peru.

The wingspan is about 23 mm. The forewings are dark fuscous, with three pale lines across each wing, each with a thick middle thread. The hindwings are paler, crossed by alternate thick and thin dark grey lines, which are strongest on the inner margin, the costal half being blurred grey.

References

Moths described in 1907
lugubris
Moths of South America